Diketene is an organic compound with the molecular formula , and which is sometimes written as .  It is formed by dimerization of ketene, . Diketene is a member of the oxetane family. It is used as a reagent in organic chemistry. It is a colorless liquid.

Production

The dimerization to diketene proceeds spontaneously at room temperature:

Reactions
Heating or irradiation with UV light regenerates the ketene monomer:
(C2H2O)2 <=> 2 CH2CO
Alkylated ketenes also dimerize with ease and form substituted diketenes.

Diketene readily hydrolyzes in water forming acetoacetic acid.

Certain diketenes with two aliphatic chains, such as alkyl ketene dimers (AKDs), are used industrially to improve hydrophobicity in paper.

At one time acetic anhydride was prepared by the reaction of ketene with acetic acid:
H2C=C=O + CH3COOH -> (CH3CO)2O

Acetoacetylation
Diketene also reacts with alcohols and amines to the corresponding acetoacetic acid derivatives.  The process is sometimes called acetoacetylation. An example is the reaction with 2-aminoindane:

Diketene is an important industrial intermediate used for the production of acetoacetate esters and amides as well as substituted 1-phenyl-3-methylpyrazolones. The latter are used in the manufacture of dyestuffs and pigments.  A typical reaction is:

ArNH2 + (CH2CO)2 -> ArNHC(O)CH2C(O)CH3

These acetoacetamides are precursors to arylide yellow and diarylide pigments.

Use 
Diketenes with two alkyl chains are used in the manufacture of paper for sizing of paper in order to improve their printability (by hydrophobization). Besides the rosin resins with about 60% share of world consumption, long chain diketenes called alkylketene dimers (AKD) are with 16% share the most important synthetic paper sizes, they are usually used in concentrations of 0.15%, meaning 1.5 kg solid AKD/t paper.

The preparation of AKD is carried out by chlorination of long chain fatty acids (such as stearic acid, using chlorinating agents such as thionyl chloride) to give the corresponding acid chlorides and subsequent elimination of HCl by amines (for example triethylamine) in toluene or other solvents:

Furthermore, diketenes are used as intermediates in the manufacture of pharmaceuticals, insecticides and dyes. For example pyrazolones are formed from substituted phenylhydrazines, they were used as analgetics but are now largely obsolete. With methylamine diketenes reacts to N,N'-dimethylacetoacetamide which is chlorinated with sulfuryl chloride and reacted with trimethyl phosphite to the highly toxic insecticide monocrotophos (especially toxic to bees). Diketenes react with substituted aromatic amines to acetoacetanilides, which are important precursors for mostly yellow, orange or red azo dyes and azo pigments.

Exemplary for the synthesis of arylides by the reaction of diketenes with aromatic amines is:

Aromatic diazonium coupling with arylides to form azo dyes, such as Pigment Yellow 74:

The industrial synthesis of the sweetener acesulfam-K is based on the reaction of diketene with sulfamic acid and cyclization by sulfur trioxide (SO3).

Safety
Despite its high reactivity as an alkylating agent, and unlike analogue β-lactones propiolactone and β-butyrolactone, diketene is inactive as a carcinogen, possibly due to the instability of its DNA adducts.

References

Alkene derivatives
Oxetanes
Lactones